If My Heart Had Wings is an album by the American musician Melissa Manchester, released in 1995. It was a commercial disappointment.

Manchester promoted the album by performing the album's first single, "In a Perfect World", on the soap opera General Hospital.

Production
The album was executive produced by Arif Mardin and Michael Lippman. Due to Manchester's work on the musical I Sent a Letter to My Love, the album was produced over a period of two years. "If My Heart Had Wings" was written with Amy Sky.

Critical reception

Entertainment Weekly wrote that "too often, the tunes on If My Heart Had Wings sound like bland anthems in search of a maudlin movie score." The Pittsburgh Post-Gazette thought that "Manchester turns in a hopelessly-out-of-it performance that serves as a harsh reminder that having great pipes is no guarantee of success." The Atlanta Journal-Constitution opined that it was "too bad Manchester couldn't take a cue from Bonnie Raitt, whose music has grown along with her shock of gray hair and her insight."

AllMusic wrote that the album was "filled with big, dramatic ballads and widescreen production values." MusicHound Rock: The Essential Album Guide considered the album to be "not a great work [but] representative of her talent."

Track listing

References

Melissa Manchester albums
1995 albums
Atlantic Records albums